Ecotage is sabotage carried out for environmental reasons.

Cases

All damage figures below are in United States dollars. Some well-known acts of ecotage have included:

Circa 1969–1985; ecological activist James F. Phillips, operating covertly under the codename "The Fox", carried out a series of ecotage actions and subvertising campaigns against corporations that were polluting the Fox River in Illinois.
1998 – Arson of buildings at Vail Mountain in the United States by the Earth Liberation Front (ELF).
March 11, 1999 – Genetically engineered potatoes uprooted at Crop and Food research centre in New Zealand.
December 25, 1999 – In Monmouth, Oregon, fire destroys the main office of the Boise Cascade logging company costing over $1 million ($ million in  dollars). ELF claim responsibility.
2001 – Members of the ELF were prosecuted for setting off a firebomb that caused $7 million in damages ($ million in  dollars) at the University of Washington's Center for Urban Horticulture.
2003 – On August 1, a 206-unit condominium being built in San Diego, California was burnt down causing damage in excess of $20 million ($ million in  dollars). A 12-foot banner at the scene read "If you build it, we will burn it," signed, "The E.L.F.s are mad."
2003 – On August 22, arsonists associated with the Earth Liberation Front attacked several car dealerships in east suburban Los Angeles, burning down a warehouse and vandalizing over 100 vehicles, most of them SUVs or Hummers (chosen for their notoriously poor fuel efficiency) and causing over $1 million in damage ($ million in  dollars).

In literature and popular culture
In their 1972 environmental-action book Ecotage!, Sam Love and David Obst claimed to have coined the word "ecotage"  by combining "ecology" and "sabotage" to describe a "branch of tactical biology."

In fiction, the practice of ecotage was popularized in Edward Abbey's 1975 anarchistic novel The Monkey Wrench Gang and its sequel Hayduke Lives! (1990). It has also been treated in other novels including Carl Hiaasen's Tourist Season (1986) and Sick Puppy (2000), Neal Stephenson's Zodiac: The Eco-Thriller (1988), T. Coraghessan Boyle's A Friend of the Earth (2000), Dave Foreman's The Lobo Outback Funeral Home (2000), and Richard Melo's Jokerman 8 (2004). Radical depictions of environmental protection also inform major Native American novels including N. Scott Momaday's House Made of Dawn (1968), James Welch's Winter in the Blood (1974), and Leslie Marmon Silko's Ceremony (1977).

Several books written specifically for children and young adults have also explored radical responses to environmental endangerment including Carl Hiaasen's Hoot! (2002), Flush (2005), and Scat (2009), Claire Dean's Girlwood (2008), S. Terrell French's Operation Redwood (2011), and Silas House and Neela Vaswani's Same Sun Here (2012).

Ecotage is mentioned in the Mars trilogy of science fiction novels by Kim Stanley Robinson as a means of protest shown by the Red political party. Typically the "Reds" would destroy terraforming ventures in an effort to slow the terraforming of Mars.

The Concrete mini series Think Like a Mountain is centred about ecotage aimed to protect first growth forests in the Pacific Northwest.

Ecotage also informs movies such as Choke Canyon (1986) and On Deadly Ground (1994).

See also
Radical environmentalism
Environmental movement
Operation Backfire (FBI)
Green Scare
Eco-terrorism

References

External links

Ecodefense: A Field Guide To Monkeywrenching - Online text

Eco-terrorism
Radical environmentalism
Protest tactics
1970s neologisms
Sabotage